The East Newark School District is a community public school district that serves students in pre-Kindergarten through eighth grade from East Newark, in Hudson County, New Jersey, United States.

As of the 2018–19 school year, the district, comprising one school, had an enrollment of 247 students and 15.9 classroom teachers (on an FTE basis), for a student–teacher ratio of 15.5:1.

The district is classified by the New Jersey Department of Education as being in District Factor Group "A", the lowest of eight groupings. District Factor Groups organize districts statewide to allow comparison by common socioeconomic characteristics of the local districts. From lowest socioeconomic status to highest, the categories are A, B, CD, DE, FG, GH, I and J.

For ninth through twelfth grades, public school students attend Harrison High School in Harrison, as part of a sending/receiving relationship with the Harrison Public Schools. Citing rising tuition costs, the district announced in 2013 that it was seeking to sever its relationship with Harrison and send its students to Kearny High School, where tuition costs for students would be substantially lower than the $14,674 per student paid to Harrison for the 2012-13 school year. In 2015, the district agreed to a new six-year sending agreement with the Harrison school district under which East Newark would pay $13,000 per student, rising by 2% annually, a drop from the $16,100 cost per student paid as of the 2014-15 school year. As of the 2018–19 school year, the high school had an enrollment of 692 students and 54.0 classroom teachers (on an FTE basis), for a student–teacher ratio of 12.8:1.

Schools
East Newark Public School (grades PreK-8). As of the 2018–19 school year, the school had an enrollment of 239 students.

Administration
Core members of the district's administration are:
Dr. Richard Corbett, Superintendent / Principal
Robert Clark, Business Administrator / Board Secretary

Board of education
The district's board of education has five members who set policy and oversee the fiscal and educational operation of the district through its administration. As a Type I school district, the board's trustees are appointed by the Mayor to serve three-year terms of office on a staggered basis, with either one or two members up for reappointment each year. Of the more than 600 school districts statewide, East Newark is one of 15 districts with appointed school boards.

References

External links

East Newark Public School
 
School Data for the East Newark Public School, National Center for Education Statistics

East Newark, New Jersey
New Jersey District Factor Group A
School districts in Hudson County, New Jersey
Public K–8 schools in New Jersey